The Mandela National Stadium is a multi-purpose stadium in Uganda. It is named after the South African then-President and anti-apartheid icon, Nelson Mandela. The stadium's record attendance of 50,000 was set in 2004, in a football match between the national football teams of Uganda and South Africa.

Location
The stadium is located on Namboole Hill in Bweyogerere Ward, Kira Municipality, Wakiso District.

Overview
Mandela National Stadium is mainly used for soccer matches, although other sports such as athletics are also practised. The stadium has a seating capacity of 45,202. The stadium is home to the Uganda national football team, known as the Uganda Cranes.

A committee of the Ugandan parliament reported in 2015 that the stadium was on the verge of financial collapse, claiming that the stadium had suffered from more than a decade of "mismanagement and wanton abuse" and incurred losses totaling UGX:3.6 billion. Running the stadium profitably in a private-public partnership arrangement remains a challenge.

History
The stadium was built with a grant of US$36 million from the People's Republic of China (PRC). Originally it was called Namboole Stadium, getting its name from the hill on which it was built. It is now officially called Mandela National Stadium, named after the former South African president, Nelson Mandela. It was opened in 1997 with a concert by Lucky Dube, a reggae artist from South Africa. The stadium was refurbished in 2010–11, with a US$2.8 million grant from the PRC.

See also
 List of African stadiums by capacity
 List of stadiums in Africa

References

External links
Photo at cafe.daum.net/stade
Photo at worldstadiums.com
Photo at fussballtempel.net
Photo at pbase.com

Athletics (track and field) venues in Uganda
Football venues in Uganda
Uganda
Kira Town
Multi-purpose stadiums in Uganda
Sport in Kampala
Buildings and structures in Kampala
Chinese aid to Africa
Sports venues completed in 1997
1997 establishments in Uganda